The German People's Party in Romania (PPGR) was a political party which activated in the Kingdom of Romania between 1935 and 1938, claiming to represent the entire ethnic German community of the country.

History 

Alfred Bonfert founded the PPGR on April 22, 1935, in a split with the Nazi-oriented German Party, whose president he accused of having a conciliatory attitude toward the party's democratic leaders, and which he denounced as Judeo-Communist during the next few years. The party's base was the Volksdeutsche bourgeoisie, influenced by Nazism. It was organised on the Hitler-created model, with a paramilitary system in which the cadres were named by superior hierarchical organs. It ran three official newspapers: Der Stürmer (Timișoara), Ost-deutscher beobachter (Sibiu) and Sachsenburg (Brașov).

In its programme of 1935, the PPGR asked for the 1923 Constitution to be respected, as well as for cultural autonomy for the local German community. Besides its programme, the party's practical activity entailed cultivating a German (in this case Nazi) spirit among the Germans of Romania, and implanting each one of these with the idea that he represented an element, living abroad, of the Great Reich, whose interests he had to serve. The PPGR was hostile to Romanians and tried to isolate ethnic Germans from the general population. It adopted an intransigent attitude toward the country's governments, disavowing collaboration and pursuing a policy of confrontation toward them. A veritable fifth column for the Reich, it was never very popular, gaining under 1% of the vote at the 1937 election despite Germans forming over 4% of the population.

Dissolution 

The German People's Party, along with all other parties extant in Romania, was dissolved on 30 March 1938. On 27 October 1938, following orders from Berlin, the remnants of PPGR were merged with the German Party.

References 

 Enciclopedia partidelor politice din România, 1859-2003, Editura Meronia, Bucharest 2003, 

German diaspora political parties
German nationalist political parties
German organizations in Romania
20th century in Transylvania
Nazi parties
Defunct political parties in Romania
Political parties of minorities in Romania
Fascist parties in Romania
Regionalist parties in Romania
Political parties established in 1935
Political parties disestablished in 1938
Anti-communist parties